Spicer Manufacturing Company was an American manufacturer of automotive parts, including the Spicer joint, invented by Clarence W. Spicer.

History
Starting in April 1904, Spicer's patented joint was initially manufactured through an arrangement with the Potter Printing Press Company in Plainfield, New Jersey. Spicer incorporated the Spicer Universal Joint Manufacturing Company in May 1905, shortening the name to Spicer Manufacturing Company in 1909.

In 1910, the company relocated to a site adjacent to the Lehigh Valley Railroad and Bound Brook in South Plainfield, New Jersey. Charles A. Dana joined the company in 1914 and renamed it the Dana Corporation in 1946. Production of universal joints was moved to a new plant in Toledo, Ohio, between 1926 and 1928.

The plant in South Plainfield was sold in 1930 and subsequently occupied by a number of different manufacturers, most recently Cornell Dubilier Electronics, Inc. The plant was documented by the Historic American Engineering Record in 2006 prior to its demolition in 2007-08.

References

External links

Auto parts suppliers of the United States
Buildings and structures in Middlesex County, New Jersey
Manufacturing companies established in 1905
Historic American Engineering Record in New Jersey
Superfund sites in New Jersey
1905 establishments in New Jersey